Asylums: Essays on the Condition of the Social Situation of Mental Patients and Other Inmates is a 1961 collection of four essays by the sociologist Erving Goffman.

Summary
Based on his participant observation field work (he was employed as a physical therapist's assistant under a grant from the National Institute of Mental Health at a mental institution in Washington, D.C.), Goffman details his theory of the "total institution" (principally in the example he gives, as the title of the book indicates, mental institutions) and the process by which it takes efforts to maintain predictable and regular behavior on the part of both "guard" and "captor," suggesting that many of the features of such institutions serve the ritual function of ensuring that both classes of people know their function and social role, in other words of "institutionalising" them. Goffman concludes that adjusting the inmates to their role has at least as much importance as "curing" them. In the essay "Notes on the Tinkering Trades," Goffman concluded that the "medicalization" of mental illness and the various treatment modalities are offshoots of the 19th century and the Industrial Revolution and that the so-called "medical model" for treating patients was a variation on the way trades- and craftsmen of the late 19th century repaired clocks and other mechanical objects: in the confines of a shop or store, contents and routine of which remained a mystery to the customer.

The book comprises four free-standing essays On the Characteristics of Total Institutions, The Moral Career of the Mental Patient, The Underlife of a Public Institution and The Medical Model and Mental Hospitalization.

Reception
Asylums brought Goffman immediate recognition when it was published in 1961, and by the 1970s had become required reading in some introductory sociology courses, according to socialist author Peter Sedgwick, who considered the book a "powerful and compelling study" and the recognition it brought to Goffman "thoroughly deserved".

Self-Reflection
After experiencing the mental illness of person close to him first-hand (presumably his first wife who committed suicide in 1964) Goffman remarked this book would have been "very different" had he written it after the experience.

See also
 Stanford prison experiment

References

1961 non-fiction books
Anti-psychiatry books
Books about psychiatric hospitals
Books by Erving Goffman
English-language books
Sociology books
Essay collections
Books about social constructionism
Symbolic interactionism
Anchor Books books